The 2018–19 Gibraltar Intermediate Cup is a single-leg knockout tournament played by under-23 clubs from Gibraltar, who compete in the Gibraltar Intermediate League. With 9 teams competing in its inaugural edition, the first round consisted of two teams playing off to compete in the quarter-finals.

The champions of this first edition were Mons Calpe, who defeated Manchester 62 4–1 in the final on 15 January 2019.

First round
The draw for the first round took place on 29 November 2018, with the match taking place on 3 December. The teams taking part were Lynx and Glacis United.

Quarter-finals
The draws for the quarter-finals and semi-finals were made on 5 December 2018. The matches are to be played between 20–22 December 2018. St Joseph's dissolved their intermediate team ahead of their tie against Gibraltar Phoenix, so Phoenix were granted a walkover win.

Semi-finals
Semi-finals took place on 6 January 2019.

Final

Top Scorers
.
2 goals

  Declan Pizarro (Glacis United)
  Nacho Callejón (Manchester 62)
  Ethan Moya (Manchester 62)
  Alejandro Valero (Manchester 62)
  Jaron Vinet (Mons Calpe)

1 goals

  Enzo Coello (Europa)
  Lee Muscat (Europa)
  Aaron Payas (Europa)
  Peter Sardeña (Gibralar Phoenix)
  Kayron Smullen (Gibraltar Phoenix)
  Jonathan Moreno (Glacis United)
  Daniel Pratts (Glacis United)
  Sean Montovio (Lincoln Red Imps)
  Alain Pons (Lincoln Red Imps)
  Brendan Ramagge (Lions Gibraltar)
  Lython Marquez (Manchester 62)
  Paolo Sousa (Manchester 62)
  Luke Bautista (Mons Calpe)
  Lautaro Fernández (Mons Calpe)
  Alex Gonzalez (Mons Calpe)
  Kelvin Morgan (Mons Calpe)
  Kevagn Robba (Mons Calpe)
  Juan Pablo Sosa (Mons Calpe)

References

2018–19 in Gibraltar football
Football competitions in Gibraltar